Christiane Collange (born 1930) is a French journalist and author.

Early life
Christiane Collange was born as Christiane Servan-Schreiber on October 29, 1930. Her father, Émile Servan-Schreiber, was a Jewish journalist and author. Her mother, Denise Brésard, was Roman Catholic. Her paternal father, Joseph Schreiber, was a Jewish-Prussian immigrant. She has two brothers, Jean-Jacques Servan-Schreiber and Jean-Louis Servan-Schreiber, and two sisters, Brigitte Gros and Bernadette Gradis. The Servan-Schreiber family (up to 200 members) have a family reunion every five years.

Collange graduated from Sciences Po.

Career
Collange is a journalist. She was the editor of Madame Express, a supplement of L'Express. She became the editor-in-chief of Le Jardin des Modes in 1970.

Collange is the author of many books. In her first book, Madame et le management, published in 1969, she argued that women should run their households like a business.

Collange serves on the honorary committee of the Association pour le droit de mourir dans la dignité, a pro-euthanasia organization.

Personal life
Collange married and divorced three times. With one of her husbands, journalist and author Jean Ferniot, she has a son, Vincent Ferniot.

Works

References

1930 births
Living people
French people of German-Jewish descent
French people of Polish-Jewish descent
Sciences Po alumni
20th-century French journalists
French women journalists
20th-century French women